The England cricket team toured India from 9 November 2008 to 23 December 2008 and played 2 Test matches and  5 One Day Internationals (ODIs).

Following the attacks in Mumbai on 26 November, the final 2 ODIs against India were cancelled, India taking the series 5-0.

As a result of the Mumbai Attacks the Test matches were moved from Ahmedabad and Mumbai to Chennai and Mohali. England flew home initially and then attended a training camp in Abu Dhabi. On 7 December the England team decided to participate in the 2 match Test series and arrived in Chennai the next day.

ODI series

India won the series 5–0. The last 2 scheduled ODIs were cancelled, following the attacks in Mumbai. The player of the series was Yuvraj Singh, who hit 2 centuries, on his way to 325 runs at an average of 65.00. India secured large winning margins in the first 3 matches, and the last. The fourth and closest match included a controversial application of the Duckworth-Lewis method, prompting the England camp to suggest a rethink of its methodologies.

1st ODI

2nd ODI

3rd ODI

4th ODI

5th ODI

 2 further ODIs were scheduled for Guwahati (29 November) and Delhi (2 December) but were cancelled for security reasons following the 2008 Mumbai attacks.

Test series

1st Test

2nd Test

 The Test matches were originally scheduled for Ahmedabad and Mumbai but were moved to Chennai and Mohali following the 2008 Mumbai attacks.

Tour Matches

Mumbai XI vs England XI

Mumbai Cricket Association XI vs England XI

 A first class tour match was also planned but was cancelled following the 2008 Mumbai attacks

References

External links
 

2008 in English cricket
2008 in Indian cricket
2008–09
Indian cricket seasons from 2000–01
International cricket competitions in 2008–09